
 
The Bania (also spelled Baniya, Banija, Banya, Vaniya, Vani, Vania and Vanya) is a Vaishya community mainly found in Indian states of Gujarat, and Rajasthan, but they are also found in Madhya Pradesh. Haryana, Punjab, Chandigarh, Delhi, Himachal Pradesh, Uttarakhand, and Uttar Pradesh,  Traditionally, the main occupations of the community are merchants, bankers, money-lenders, and in modern times they are mostly White-collar and Knowledge workers and owners of commercial enterprises. 

The community is composed of several sub-castes including the Agarwal Banias, Maheshwari Banias, Porwal Banias, among others. Most Banias follow Hinduism or Jainism, but a few have converted to Sikhism, Islam, Christianity and Buddhism. Most of Hindu Banias are Vaishnavas and are followers of Vallabhacharya and Swaminarayan.

Etymology
The derives from the Sanskrit word vanik. In Bengal the term Bania is used to indicate people who are moneylenders and indigenously developed bankers, without respect to caste.

See also 
 Vaishya

References

Further reading

Social groups of India
 
Vaishya community